The Triple Crown of Hiking informally refers to the three major U.S. long-distance hiking trails:
 Appalachian Trail – , between Springer Mountain in Georgia and Mount Katahdin in Maine and traversing North Carolina, Tennessee, Virginia, West Virginia, Maryland, Pennsylvania, New Jersey, New York, Connecticut, Massachusetts, Vermont, and New Hampshire.
 Pacific Crest Trail – , between Mexico and Canada following the highest portion of the Sierra Nevada and Cascade Range and traversing Washington, Oregon, and California.
 Continental Divide Trail – , between Mexico and Canada following the Continental Divide along the Rocky Mountains and traversing Montana, Idaho, Wyoming, Colorado, and New Mexico.

These three trails were the first designated National Scenic Trails in the National Trails System. A total of 22 states are visited if the three trails are completed. The American Long Distance Hiking Association – West (ALDHA–West) is the only organization that recognizes this hiking feat. At the ALDHA–West gathering, held each fall, the Triple Crown honorees are recognized and awarded plaques noting their achievement. As of the end of the application period in 2021, 525 hikers have been designated Triple Crowners by ALDHA-West since 1994.

History
The first person to ever achieve The Triple Crown of Hiking was Eric Ryback. Ryback completed the Appalachian Trail in 1969 as a 16-year-old. He completed the Pacific Crest Trail in 1970 and chronicled it in his 1971 book The High Adventure of Eric Ryback: Canada to Mexico on Foot. Ryback completed a route approximating today's Continental Divide Trail in 1972 and chronicled it in his second book, The Ultimate Journey (now out of print).

In 2013, Reed Gjonnes, age 13, became the youngest person to thru-hike all three trails to complete the Triple Crown. A thru-hike is defined as completing a long trail in a single trip. She hiked all three trails as continuous northbound hikes in one hiking season each. Along with her father Eric Gjonnes, she hiked The Pacific Crest Trail in 2011, the Appalachian Trail in 2012, and the Continental Divide Trail in 2013.

As of 2018, Christian Geiger, age 9, is the youngest person to have hiked all three trails to complete the Triple Crown. Christian, known by his trail name Buddy Backpacker, completed all three trails with his step-father Dion Pagonis. Together they completed the Appalachian Trail in 2013 when Buddy was 5,  the Pacific Crest Trail when he was 6 in 2014, and began the Continental Divide Trail in the spring of 2016 and completed it in September 2017 when he was 9.

In 2018, Elsye Walker, known as Chardonnay on the trail, became the first African American to complete the Triple Crown. She thru-hiked the Pacific Crest Trail in 2015, the Appalachian Trail in 2016/2018, and in 2017 she thru-hiked the Continental Divide Trail.

On September 15, 2019, combat veteran Will Robinson, age 38, became the first African American man to complete the Triple Crown.  Will thru-hiked the Pacific Crest Trail in 2017, the Appalachian Trail in 2018, and completed the Continental Divide Trail in 2019. Will's trail name is Akuna, from the Swahili phrase Hakuna Matata meaning "no worries", and made popular by a song in The Lion King.

By the end of 2018, only ten people had completed the Triple Crown within one calendar year. “Flyin’” Brian Robinson was the first, and Heather “Anish” Anderson was the only woman. The three long distance hikes can technically be done continuously in one season -- however, because of snow, they are generally attempted in sections.

Calendar-year Triple Crown
The most prestigious accomplishment in long-distance hiking is the completion of the Triple Crown of Hiking in a single calendar year (January 1 through December 31). The first person to hike the Triple Crown in a calendar year was Brian Robinson, who completed the Triple Crown in 2001. The first woman to complete the challenge was Heather Anderson (AKA Anish) in 2018. Most CYTC (calendar-year triple crown) finishers "flip flop" across the three trails through the year, hiking sections that are the best suited for the time of year. In 2005, Matt "Squeaky" Hazely was the first person to complete a CYTC without flipping, where he hiked each trail in its entirety (either northbound or southbound) before progressing to the next one.

See also
 Appalachian Long Distance Hikers Association (ALDHA–East)
 Backpacking (hiking)
 European long-distance paths, 11 European long-distance paths
 Long-distance trail
 Long-distance trails in the United States
 National Millennium Trails, 16 trails reflecting U.S. history and culture
 Thru-hiking

References

Further reading
 Berger, Karen (2001) Hiking the Triple Crown, Mountaineers Books, Seattle, Washington.
Berger, Karen and Daniel Smith (1993). Where the Waters Divide: A Walk along America's Continental Divide. New York: Random House.
 Bruce, Dan (2000) The Thru-Hiker's Handbook Hot Springs, North Carolina: Center for Appalachian Trail Studies.
 Norton, Russell (1997) Long Trail End-to-Ender's Guide. Waterbury Center, Vermont: Green Mountain Club.
 Shaffer, Earl V. (1983) Walking With Spring. Harper's Ferry, West Virginia: the Appalachian Trail Conference.

External links
 Triple Crown of Hiking (ALDHA–West)
 Triple Crown of Hiking/marmot
 
 Comparison of the trails

Hiking in the United States